Scinax is a genus of frogs (snouted treefrogs) in the family Hylidae found in eastern and southern Mexico to Argentina and Uruguay, Trinidad and Tobago, and Saint Lucia. These are small to moderate-sized tree frogs, drably colored. Duellman and Wiens resurrected this genus in 1992. The name originates from the Greek word skinos, meaning quick or nimble.

Species
This following species are recognised in the genus Scinax:

References
  1992. The status of the hylid frog genus Ololygon and the recognition of Scinax Wagler, 1830. Occasional Papers of the Museum of Natural History of the University of Kansas. 151:1-23.
  1993. Hylid frogs of the genus Scinax Wagler, 1830, in Amazonian Ecuador and Peru. Occasional Papers of the Museum of Natural History of the University of Kansas. 153:1-57.

External links
 . 2007. Amphibian Species of the World: an Online Reference. Version 5.1 (10 October 2007). Scinax. Electronic Database accessible at http://research.amnh.org/herpetology/amphibia/index.php. American Museum of Natural History, New York, USA. (Accessed: 29 Apr 2008).
  [web application]. 2008. Berkeley, California: Scinax. AmphibiaWeb, available at http://amphibiaweb.org/. (Accessed: 29 Apr 2008).
  taxon Scinax at http://www.eol.org.
  Taxon Scinax at https://www.itis.gov/index.html. (Accessed: 29 Apr 2008).
  Taxon Scinax at http://data.gbif.org/welcome.htm
 Sazima Network - Papers, Pictures and Blog by Sazima.

 
Hylidae
Amphibian genera
Taxa named by Johann Georg Wagler